Sonny and Jed (lit. "The Band of J. & S. - Criminal Chronicle of the Far West") is a 1972 Italian Spaghetti Western film about a  sheriff's (Sheriff Franciscus, played by Telly Savalas) relentless effort to stop a robber (Jed, played by Tomas Milian) and his girlfriend (Sonny, played by Susan George). The film was directed by Sergio Corbucci and is noted for its music, scored by Ennio Morricone.

Cast 
 Tomas Milian: Jed Trigado
 Susan George: Sonny Trigado, née Lester
 Telly Savalas: Sheriff Franciscus
 Rosanna Yanni : Linda Moreno (as Rossana Yanni)
 Laura Betti: Betty
 Franco Giacobini: Aparacito
 Eduardo Fajardo: Don Garcia Moreno  
 Herbert Fux: Merril 
 Gene Collins : Hotel Owner (as Gene Collings)
 Werner Pochath : Pistolero (as Wernet Pochat)
 Álvaro de Luna : Sheriff (as Alvaro De Luna)

External links 

1972 films
Films directed by Sergio Corbucci
Spaghetti Western films
Films scored by Ennio Morricone
1972 Western (genre) films
West German films
1970s Italian-language films
English-language German films
English-language Italian films
English-language Spanish films
1970s English-language films
Films shot in Almería
1972 multilingual films
Italian multilingual films
Spanish multilingual films
German multilingual films
1970s Italian films